Victor Calvo (February 13, 1924 – September 26, 2010) was a Democratic politician from California who served in the California State Assembly from 1974 until 1980.

Calvo was born in Mountain View, California and served on its city council from 1962 until 1968 and served three different years as mayor during his tenure. He served on the Santa Clara County Board of Supervisors from 1969 until he resigned to take his Assembly seat in 1974. After leaving the Assembly, Calvo served on the California Public Utilities Commission from 1981 until 1987 and the California Coastal Commission from 1987 to 1989.

References

External links
Mountain View Voice: Victor Calvo, highly accomplished former mayor, dies at 86
San Francisco Chronicle: Victor Calvo, longtime public servant, dies
San Jose Mercury News: Former Assemblyman and Mountain View Mayor, Victor Calvo, dies at 86

1924 births
2010 deaths
Democratic Party members of the California State Assembly
County supervisors in California
California city council members
Mayors of places in California
People from Mountain View, California